Taua Tavaga Kitiona Seuala (died April 2013) was a Samoan politician and Cabinet Minister. He was a member of the Human Rights Protection Party.

Taua was first elected to the Legislative Assembly of Samoa in the 1996 election. he was re-elected in 2001 election. After being re-elected at the 2006 election he was appointed Minister of Agriculture. In November 2009 it was alleged that aid following the 2009 Samoa earthquake and tsunami was being directed to Taua's constituency at the expense of others.

He was re-elected at the 2011 election but not reappointed to Cabinet. His election was voided following an election petition, which found he had engaged in bribery and treating, resulting in a by-election. He subsequently pleaded guilty to three criminal charges of bribery, and was fined US$1000.

References

20th-century births
2013 deaths
Year of birth unknown
Members of the Legislative Assembly of Samoa
Human Rights Protection Party politicians
Government ministers of Samoa
Samoan politicians convicted of crimes